Daniel O’Connell Griffin (born 15 July 1967) is an American infectious disease specialist. He is president of the nonprofit organization Parasites Without Borders.

Co-director of Life Science podcast network Microbe.TV, Griffin broadcasts a weekly COVID Clinical Update as part of This Week in Virology (TWiV) podcasts.

Griffin co-authored the textbook Parasitic Diseases (7th edition 2019), available in more than 100 countries. In 2017, he published the paper Human B1 cells in umbilical cord and adult peripheral blood express the novel phenotype CD20+CD27+CD43+CD70 in the Journal of Experimental Medicine. He is senior fellow in infectious disease at United Health Group, Instructor in Clinical Medicine, Columbia University Irving Medical Centre, and Infectious Disease Clinician Chief, Pro Health Care.

Education 
Griffin earned his BA in Philosophy from the University of Colorado Boulder in 1989. He received his MD degree from New York University School of Medicine and completed an internal medicine residency at the University of Utah. He completed a PhD in Molecular medicine from the Elmezzi Graduate School of Molecular Medicine, Manhasset, New York in 2012. In 2014, he completed a fellowship in infectious diseases from North Shore-Long Island Jewish Health System-Hofstra University in Manhasset.

Research and career 
Griffin's work includes investigating the potential role of human B1 cells and natural antibodies in the development of HIV-associated malignancies. He has a special focus on HIV and tropical medicine. His research interests are broad and include studies on infectious disease and immunology, molecular medicine, and tropical medicine. As of 2021, his research focused on HIV-1, stem cell latency, stem cell gene therapy using retroviral vectors, and COVID-19.

Griffin has volunteered with the nonprofit Foundation for International Medical Relief of Children, including conducting mandatory health education sessions for its staff. He joined the biomedical research community of the Vagelos College of Physicians and Surgeons of Columbia University. He is an associate research scientist in Columbia's Department of Biochemistry and Molecular Biophysics, instructor of clinical medicine, and a member of the division of infectious diseases.

Science communication 
Griffin co-authored at least two editions of a textbox on parasitology, Parasitic Diseases, with Dickson Despommier. The two men decided to found the nonprofit organization Parasites Without Borders to disseminate clinical information about parasitic disease, including the textbook. As of June 2021, 40,000 copies had been distributed to over 100 countries.

Since episode 80 of the monthly podcast This Week in Parasitism (TWiP), Griffin has been its co-host with Racaniello and Despommier.

In early March 2020 as the COVID-19 pandemic began to seriously affect the New York City area, Griffin began providing clinical updates about the virus based on his practice and correspondence with medical colleagues around the world on another podcast hosted by Racaniello, This Week in Virology (TWiV). Eventually the popularity of the clinical updates resulted in Racaniello publishing them in standalone episodes of TWiV. As of May 2022, Griffin had provided 112 such clinical updates on TWiV.

Affiliations 
Griffin is a member in the following scientific societies or associations:
 American Society for Microbiology (ASM) 
 American Association for the Advancement of Science (AAAS)
 Infectious Diseases Society of America (IDSA)
 American Society of Tropical Medicine and Hygiene (ASTMH)
 International Society for Travel Medicine (ISTM)
 American Society of Parasitologists (ASP)

Patents
 Human B1 cells and uses thereof.

Awards
 Ruth and Leonard Litwin Fellowship Award in 2011 
 Davies Award in 2006 (An international award given by HIMSS, the largest health IT organization in the world)

Selected publications
Human B1 cells in umbilical cord and adult peripheral blood express the novel phenotype CD20+CD27+CD43+CD70− 
Identifying Optimal COVID-19 Testing Strategies for School and Businesses: Balancing testing frequency, individual test technology, and cost 
Human B-1 cells take the stage 
A small CD11b+ human B1 cell subpopulation stimulates T cells and is expanded in lupus.
Human “orchestrator” CD11b+ B1 cells spontaneously secrete interleukin-10 and regulate T-cell activity.
Human B1 cell frequency: isolation and analysis of human B1 cells 
Human B1 cells are CD3−: A reply to “A human equivalent of mouse B-1 cells?” and “The nature of circulating CD27+CD43+ B cells”

External links 
 Parasites Without Borders
 Google Scholar - Daniel O'Connell Griffin

References 

Living people
American immunologists
American physicians
American writers
1967 births
New York University Grossman School of Medicine alumni
University of Colorado alumni
American podcasters